California's 13th district may refer to:

 California's 13th congressional district
 California's 13th State Assembly district
 California's 13th State Senate district